Axis Communications AB is a Swedish manufacturer of network cameras, access control, and network audio devices for the physical security and video surveillance industries.

History 
Axis Communications was founded in 1984 by Martin Gren, Mikael Karlsson and Keith Bloodworth in Lund, Sweden. The company developed and sold protocol converters and printer interfaces for the connection of PC printers in IBM mainframe and mini-computer environments. By the end of the 1980s, Axis Communications had opened its first U.S. sales office in Boston, Massachusetts and, in the early 1990s, started shifting its focus away from IBM mainframes towards networking and the TCP/IP protocol.

In 1991, Axis Communications introduced a multi-protocol print server supporting both TCP/IP and NetWare. In 1993, the company developed its own CPU Architecture, ETRAX CRIS, for microprocessors used in embedded devices. In 1995, the company introduced a file server independent, multi-protocol CD-ROM server, supporting TCP/IP (NFS) and Windows (SMB), for Ethernet networks, the AXIS 850. By 1995, Axis Communications opened sales offices in Hong Kong, Singapore, and Tokyo, Japan.

In 1996, Axis Communications introduced the industry's first network camera, the AXIS 200. This was followed in 1999 by the AXIS 2100 which was the first volume product using an embedded Linux. In 2003, the company introduced the AXIS 205, the smallest network camera of its time.

In 2008, Axis Communications, together with Bosch and Sony, announced that the companies would cooperate in order to standardize the interface of network video products and form a new industry standards body called ONVIF (Open Network Video Interface Forum).

On February 10, 2015, Japanese multinational corporation Canon Inc., which specializes in the manufacture of imaging and optical products, announced a cash bid of 23.6 billion Swedish kronor (US$2.83 billion) to acquire Axis Communications. While Canon is the majority shareholder, Axis is run independently. Canon's network cameras have been sold and supported by Axis Communications in the EMEA (Europe, the Middle East and Africa) region since September 1, 2016, and in North America since October 1, 2016. In November 2018, Axis Communications was delisted from Nasdaq Stockholm.

On February 1, 2016, Axis Communications acquired Citilog, a video analytics provider for traffic and transportation security and safety applications. On April 30, 2021, Axis Communications announced that it was selling Citilog, citing challenges in finding "desired synergies because of our different go-to-market models." On May 30, Axis Communications acquired 2N Telecommunications, a provider of IP intercom systems based in the Czech Republic. On June 3, 2016, Axis Communications acquired Cognimatics, a video analytics provider for retail applications such as people counting, queue measurement and occupancy estimation.

In May 2018, Axis opened a new R&D office for software development in Linköping, Sweden.

Operations
Axis Communications operates offices in more than 50 countries and employs over 3,800 people.

Installations include the City of Houston, Sydney Airport, Moscow Metro, The White House and Madrid Buses. 

In 2019, Axis Communications published a sustainability report stating that 80 percent of its network cameras and video encoders are PVC-free.

Technology

Products 
Network Cameras - Axis Communications develops and sells network cameras for many applications. Products include PTZ, vandal resistant, thermal, nitrogen-pressurized, and wireless cameras. It introduced the industry's first thermal network camera, the AXIS Q1910 in January 2010 and the industry's first HDTV network camera, the AXIS Q1755 in December 2008. In March 2022, the company released the AXIS M5000-G which can connect to Z-Wave devices and cover an indoor area of up to 400 m2. Most of these cameras have video content analysis capabilities, such as advanced motion detection. Certain Network Cameras support advanced video content analysis which can detect objects and human behavior.  
Body Cameras - In March 2020, Axis Communications entered the body cam market with its own open architecture system, competing with market incumbents Axon, Digital Ally, Wolfcom and Motorola Solutions with its Watchguard Video brand.
Video Encoders - Axis Communications develops and sells video encoders allowing for video from analog systems to be converted into digital format for IP networks. Recent models are based on the H.264 video compression standard which lower bandwidth and storage requirements without impacting image quality. The company sells 1-port, 4-port, 6-port and 16-port video encoders as well as rack-mountable systems for large installations.
Video Management Software - Axis Communications sells video management software which it markets under the name AXIS Camera Station. The software provides remote video monitoring, recording and event management functionality. Its API allows for integration with other systems such as point of sale and access control. Axis sells a light-weight remote-viewing application under the name AXIS Companion.
Physical Access Control - Axis Communications started offering physical access control systems in late 2013. The first product was the AXIS A1001 network door controller. It had an open interface for integration with other IP-based security system components and third-party software. The AXIS A1001 network door controller was the first ONVIF conformant physical access control system available on the market.
Network Audio - In March 2015, Axis Communications introduced its first network audio product, a horn speaker providing talk-down audio functionality for security applications. In September 2016, it introduced two network audio loudspeakers for background music and for live or scheduled announcements in retail stores. In September 2017, Axis Communications expanded its network audio offering with an analog-to-IP audio converter and a PA system. In 2022, the company released its first Network Strobe Siren which provides audible and visual alerts.
Radar - In 2017, Axis Communications introduced its first radar, the AXIS D2050-VE, which allowed for minimization of false alarms, analytics, classification of objects, and more auto-tracking capabilities for Axis PTZ Cameras. In 2019 Axis introduced the AXIS D2110-VE radar which has Machine learning and Deep learning capabilities.

Microprocessors 
ARTPEC (Axis Real Time Picture Encoder Chip) is a system on a chip (SoC) developed by Axis Communications. There are currently 8 generations of the chip. All chips run AXIS OS, a modified version of Linux designed for embedded devices. Not all products developed by Axis Communications use its custom chip. The chip is typically found in high performance devices such as higher end cameras while lower cost devices use SoC's from Ambarella.

The ARTPEC-1 ASIC is the first ASIC designed in-house by Axis Communications for Network Video. Initial development began in 1996 in order to support hardware compression and encoding of video. At the time processors were not available for Network video. It's internal firmware is based on an embedded operating system called μClinux which became known as Embedded Linux.

The ARTPEC-2 SoC released in 2003, is based on the ETRAX CRIS architecture. Unlike ARTPEC-1 which relies on an external CPU, ARTPEC-2 has an internal ETRAX CPU which improves power efficiency and performance. Additionally, it has a MPEG-4 encoder and decoder which reduces bandwidth when streaming and recording video.

The ARTPEC-3 SoC released in 2007, is based on the ETRAX CRIS architecture. This is the first SoC developed by Axis which supports the H.264 standard for video encoding. The image processing pipeline is capable of capturing a 1080P video source at 30 frames per second.

The ARTPEC-4 SoC released in 2011, has a single core MIPS CPU (1004kc). The image processing pipeline is based on ETRAX CRIS. The SoC has Lightfinder, a technology which allows a camera to see color in challenging light conditions and P-Iris which reduces lens refraction.

The ARTPEC-5 SoC released in 2013, has a dual core MIPS CPU (1004Kf) with dual hardware threads and support for Symmetric multiprocessing. The image processing pipeline is based on ETRAX CRIS. The Chip actively increases forensic details in a scene via a technology called Forensic Capture and lowers bandwidth while preserving forensic details in an image via a technology called Zipstream.

The ARTPEC-6 SoC released in 2016, is powered by an ARM Cortex-A9 CPU. The image processing pipeline is based on ETRAX CRIS. The SoC is capable of capturing 4K video at 30 frames per second. The chip actively increases forensic details in a scene via a technology called Forensic WDR and runs video analytics.

The ARTPEC-7 SoC released in 2019, is powered by an ARM Cortex-A9 CPU. The image processing pipeline is based on ETRAX CRIS. This is the first SoC developed by Axis which supports the H.265 standard for video encoding. ARTPEC-7 has features such as secure boot which prevents booting of unauthorized firmware, improvements in low light imaging via Lightfinder 2.0, and a machine learning processor.

The ARTPEC-8 SoC released in 2021, is powered by an ARM Cortex-A53 CPU. The SoC is similar to its predecessor using the same image processing pipeline, video encoders, and security features. Primarily focused on machine learning for video analytics, the processor features a deep learning processor.

Cybersecurity vulnerabilities 
In October 2021, cybersecurity research firm Nozomi Networks published "three new vulnerabilities (CVE-2021-31986, CVE-2021-31987, CVE-2021-31988) affecting all Axis devices based on the embedded AXIS OS." Axis and Nozomi collaborated throughout the research and disclosure process, with Nozomi publishing a statement from Axis in its announcement of the vulnerability.

In order to exploit these vulnerabilities, the potential adversary needs network access and administrator level access to the Axis device. A week after their discoveries, CVE-2021-31986, CVE-2021-31987, and CVE-31998 were patched in AXIS OS 10.7, AXIS OS 2016 LTS Track 6.50.5.5, AXIS OS 2018 LTS Track 8.40.4.3, and AXIS OS 2020 LTS Track 9.80.3.5.

See also
 IP video surveillance
 Megapixel
 Image sensor
 Professional video over IP
 Closed-circuit television (CCTV)
 Closed-circuit television camera
 Video Analytics
 ONVIF
 Physical security

References

Further reading

Electronics companies of Sweden
Electronics companies established in 1984
Video surveillance companies
Canon subsidiaries
Physical security
Swedish brands
1984 establishments in Sweden
Companies formerly listed on Nasdaq Stockholm
Companies based in Lund